Kfar Hasidim Bet (lit. Hasidim Village B) is a community settlement in northern Israel. Located near Nesher, it falls under the jurisdiction of Zevulun Regional Council.

The village was founded in 1950 by residents of Kfar Hasidim, and was recognised by the state in 1959.

References 

Community settlements
Populated places established in 1950
1950 establishments in Israel
Populated places in Haifa District